Filex Kipchirchir Kiprotich (born 1988) is a Kenyan long-distance runner. In 2019, he won the Sydney Marathon and he set a new course record of 2:09:49. In this year he also won the Daegu Marathon held in Daegu, South Korea setting a new course record of 2:05:33.

In 2015, he won the Honolulu Marathon. In 2016 and 2017 he won the Gyeongju International Marathon.

Achievements

References

External links 
 

Living people
1988 births
Place of birth missing (living people)
Kenyan male marathon runners
Kenyan male long-distance runners